Jeffery S. Filkovski (born December 16, 1967) is an American football coach and former player. He is currently the head football coach at North Carolina Wesleyan College, a position he assumed in March 2013. He previously served in the same capacity at Marietta College from 2008 to 2012, compiling a record of 10–40. Filkovski played football as a quarterback at Allegheny College, leading the team to the NCAA Division III Football Championship in 1990, while rocking a mullet.

Coaching career
Filkovski was named the 28th head football coach at Marietta College on March 13, 2008. He spent five years at the helm of the program, leading the Pioneers to an overall record of 10–40 during his tenure. After going winless during the 2012 season, Filkovski resigned on November 14.

Head coaching record

References

External links
 North Carolina Wesleyan profile

1967 births
Living people
American football quarterbacks
Allegheny Gators football players
Cincinnati Bearcats football coaches
Cologne Centurions (NFL Europe) coaches
Heidelberg Student Princes football coaches
Holy Cross Crusaders football coaches
Marietta Pioneers football coaches
North Carolina Wesleyan Battling Bishops football coaches
Thomas More Saints football coaches
People from Westmoreland County, Pennsylvania
Coaches of American football from Pennsylvania
Players of American football from Pennsylvania